Panagiotis Linardakis (born 1916, date of death unknown) was a Greek sports shooter. He competed in the trap event at the 1952 Summer Olympics.

References

1916 births
Year of death missing
Greek male sport shooters
Olympic shooters of Greece
Shooters at the 1952 Summer Olympics
Place of birth missing
20th-century Greek people